Astrup is a village in Hjørring Municipality, Denmark.

References

Villages in Denmark
Populated places in the North Jutland Region
Hjørring Municipality